Ainul Kamal is a Jatiya Samajtantrik Dal-JSD politician and the former Member of Parliament of Chittagong-2.

Career
Kamal was elected to parliament from Chittagong-2 as a Jatiya Samajtantrik Dal-JSD candidate in 1986 and 1988.

References

Jatiya Samajtantrik Dal-JSD politicians
Living people
3rd Jatiya Sangsad members
4th Jatiya Sangsad members
Year of birth missing (living people)